The National Average Drug Acquisition Cost (NADAC) is the approximate invoice price pharmacies pay for medications in the United States. This applies to chain and independent pharmacies but not mail order and specialty pharmacies. Rebates pharmacies may receive after paying an invoice are not included. The NADAC data is calculated by the Centers for Medicare and Medicaid Services.

History
It was created in 2012.

See also
Average wholesale price

References

External links
NADAC data from Medicaid

Drug pricing
Medicare and Medicaid (United States)